The 2017–18 Chicago State Cougars men's basketball team represented Chicago State University during the 2017–18 NCAA Division I men's basketball season. The Cougars, led by eighth-year head coach Tracy Dildy, played their home games at the Emil and Patricia Jones Convocation Center as members of the Western Athletic Conference. They finished the season 3–29, 1–13 in WAC play to finish in last place. They lost in the quarterfinals of the WAC tournament to New Mexico State.

The Cougars had the worst average point margin in Division I at –22.7 points, despite winning two games by over 40 points.

After the season, Chicago State fired Dildy during the week of March 5, 2018, although it was not officially announced until a week later. After a nearly a five-month search, Lance Irvin, a Chicago native and former assistant coach at DePaul and several other schools, was named the new head coach of the Cougars on August 7.

Previous season
The Cougars finished the 2016–17 season 6–26, 1–13 in WAC play to finish in last place. Due to Grand Canyon's ineligibility for postseason play, they received the No. 7 seed in the WAC tournament where they lost in the quarterfinals to New Mexico State.

Offseason

Departures

2017 recruiting class

Roster

Schedule and results

|-
!colspan=9 style=| Non-conference regular season

|-
!colspan=9 style=| WAC regular season

|-
!colspan=9 style=| WAC tournament

References

Chicago State Cougars men's basketball seasons
Chicago State
2010s in Chicago
2017 in Illinois
Chicago State
Chicago State
Chicago State